Kalamboli is one of the nodes of Navi Mumbai. It is a transportation hub, being situated at the junction of the Sion-Panvel Highway, NH 48, Panvel By-Pass, NH 66 and Mumbai-Pune Expressway and is among the biggest iron and steel delivery centers in India. The township, like the rest of Navi Mumbai, is divided into sectors, which are further divided into plots. The residential and commercial areas of Kalamboli are divided by the NH 4 highway. Roadpali, a region to the north of Kalamboli, is developing at a faster rate than the latter with many residential projects coming up due to availability of land. Roadpali is located along the Taloja Link Road. Kalamboli also houses the Navi Mumbai Police Headquarters. CIDCO is the nodal administrative body for Kalamboli node. Kalamboli also has a Sewage Water Treatment Plant owned by CIDCO. Kalamboli is now governed by Panvel Municipal Corporation (PMC). The terminal of Mumbai-Pune Expressway is at Kalamboli. It also has Navi Mumbai's largest marble market alongside the Sion Panvel Highway.

Roadways 

Auto-rickshaw, along with NMMT, BEST, KDMT, MSRTC buses, are the local means for commuters. Auto rickshaws provide the primary means of personal local transportation. Traveling to other nodes, or travels at night, by auto rickshaw usually entails the payment of one-and-a-half times the regular meter fare, or some other negotiated fare. NMMT, BEST and ST buses are available from Kalamboli to Vashi, Ghatkopar, Uran and Thane, as well as the node of Panvel. The most prominent bus line in Kalamboli is Bus route 56 that runs from Mansarovar to Kalamboli Police Headquarters.

Railways 

 Kalamboli railway station (Vasai Road - Diva  Panvel route of the central line)
 Kalamboli will have three metro stations on the Phase II (MIDC Taloja-Kalamboli–Khandeshwar line) of Navi Mumbai Metro's (Line 1) each in sectors 2E, 7E and 13, once completed.

Nearest Harbour Line Railway Stations

 Mansarovar railway station - 3.5 km approx. from Kalamboli
 Kharghar railway station - 5.4 km approx. from Kalamboli
 Khandeshwar railway station - 3.9 km approx. from Kalamboli
 Panvel railway station - 6.5 km approx. from Kalamboli

Schools and Colleges 
 St. Joseph High School and Jr. College
  New Sudhagad Education Society
 Carmel Convent High School
 K.L.E. Education Society
 New English High School
 Maharashtra Education Society
 Shri Balaji International School
 Shikshan Maharshi DadaSaheb Limaye College of Arts Commerce and Science, Kalamboli
 Shri Balaji International School
 New Mumbai English School, Kalamboli

References 

Nodes of Navi Mumbai